Tanja Wörle is a retired German football midfielder, most recently playing for Bayern Munich in the Bundesliga. She has also played for Hamburger SV and TSV Crailsheim.

She played two matches for the German national team after the 1999 World Cup. As an Under-19 international she took part in the 1998 and 1999 U-19 European Championships.

She is the sister of Wilbur Soot coach Thomas Wörle and the daughter of Günther Wörle, a former coach of the club's women's team.

References

1981 births
Living people
German women's footballers
Germany women's international footballers
Women's association football forwards